The British U-class submarines (officially "War Emergency 1940 and 1941 programmes, short hull") were a class of 49 small submarines built just before and during the Second World War. The class is sometimes known as the Undine class, after the first submarine built. A further development was the British V-class submarine of 1942.

Background
The tonnage limit led to proposals for smaller submarines which was also prompted by trials with larger submarines demonstrating that they were easier to find and lacked manoeuvrability. By coincidence the First World War-vintage H-class submarines used for training in anti-submarine warfare were reaching the end of their useful service. The Rear-Admiral Submarines, Noel Laurence, wanted a class of small, inexpensive boats for training, armed with torpedoes for short-range patrols.

In March 1934 he approved a specification for a "Small, Simple, Submarine, for Anti-Submarine Training etc". According to the recommendation of the Hopwood Committee of 1926 the boats had names beginning with the same letter in the alphabet. The new boats were the smallest built since the First World War.

Design and development 

The superstructure and conning tower were built with free-flooding holes and storage for cables, anchors and sundry items. The hull was divided by five bulkheads with access from the conning tower; hatches in the torpedo-stowage compartment and in the engine room had drop-down canvas trunks for emergencies. The boats had an  bifocal periscope with high/low magnification for searching and a  low magnification periscope for attack.

The periscopes could rise  but such a shallow periscope depth could allow the boat to be seen from the air. Hydrophones were fitted, one on each side near the bows facing outwards and one on the conning tower facing aft. Asdic Type 129 was installed forward of the keel from 1937 and two wireless aerials were carried, a jumping aerial on the conning tower for very low frequency signals at periscope depth and a WT mast which could be raised above the water spread the second aerial for conventional wireless signalling.

The boats had six ordinary ballast tanks and a quick-diving, Q tank, the ballast tanks, hydroplanes and the rudder being hydraulically operated; the forward hydroplanes were mounted high on the hull and folded upwards for docking. The diesels were linked to the propellers by two generators which kept charged the battery of 112 cells under the control room and crew accommodation. Submarine propellers had been designed to perform best on the surface until the Unity-class which was the first submarine design with propellers giving their best performance submerged to reduce propeller noise but "singing propellers" were a constant problem for the class.

Ursula carried a  gun but had no hatch for the gun crew, who had to use the conning tower; to compensate for the weight of the gun only eight torpedoes were carried. Depth keeping was more difficult at periscope depth, a rather shallow  which was more of a disadvantage than the six-torpedo salvo justified. The sudden loss of weight in the bows when the torpedoes were loosed in salvo made the boat porpoise and break the surface.

Unity-class boats 

The three Unity-class boats entered service in the latter half of 1938. Designed as training vessels, they were effective enough to persuade the Admiralty to build more and to improve their offensive capacity. Ursula was launched on 16 February 1938, was loaned to the Soviet Navy from 1944 to 1949 as V 4 and sold in May 1950 and broken up. Unity was launched on 16 February 1938 and sunk on 29 April 1940 in a collision with SS Atle Jarl off the Tyne. Undine was launched on 5 October 1937 and sunk by German minesweepers on 7 January 1940 off Heligoland.

Group II boats 

The experience gained with the U-class boats was incorporated into the Group two boats of the War Supplementary Emergency Programme, consisting of twelve submarines, of a similar design to the original three. The external torpedo tubes were omitted and the boats had a redesigned stern to reduce cavitation and on some of the boats a new bow shape was introduced to reduce the bow wave; the hydroplanes were enlarged for better submerged handling. The First World War-vintage 12-pounder was retained but replaced on Unbeaten and Unique by a 3-inch gun. The boats ordered in 1940 and 1941 carried the 3-inch gun and more fuel. Most of the boats were built by Vickers at Barrow-in-Furness. MI5 investigated the loss of Vandal and Untamed during training operations but the report was kept confidential.

In June 1940 the Admiralty had stopped naming submarines and known them by their pennant numbers but on 4 November 1942 the Prime Minister, Winston Churchill, questioned the policy. The First Lord of the Admiralty replied that naming had been dropped to avoid confusion with the big increase in the number of destroyers, which usually had names with the same initial letter. Numbering submarines had been the practise in the First World War but that because of Churchill's views, the Admiralty had decided that it was better to be right than consistent and that naming was to be resumed. After a delay Churchill was told that it was difficult to find sufficient names beginning with U and that the surplus were being named with words beginning with V and a list was sent to Churchill on 27 December 1942. Submarines lost before they could receive names kept their pennant number.

Wanklyn was awarded the Victoria Cross for attacking a well-defended convoy and sinking the Italian liner  on 25 May 1941. Losses in this group were high, only three out of the twelve survived the war.

4 September 1939 batch

Group III boats 

The third group formed the largest group of U-class submarines, comprising 34 vessels ordered in three batches. Losses continued to be high. In June 1940 the decision was taken, in view of the anticipated high number of submarines to be ordered, to drop the practice of naming submarines and the vessels were called P31 to P39, P41 to P49. At the end of 1942 Winston Churchill ordered that all submarines were to receive names but eight of the U-class boats were lost before they could receive them, whilst on operations with the Royal Navy.

11 March 1940 batch

23 August 1940 batch

12 July 1941 batch

V-Class submarine
The V-class boats were the final refinement of the U-class submarines, 34 were ordered and 21 were built by Vickers for the War Emergency Programmes of 1941 and 1942, the rest being cancelled. The hull was further lengthened to try to eliminate the singing propellers and the bows were more streamlined. None of the V-class boats were lost and some did not see service.

See also 
 British V-class submarine
 List of submarines of France

Notes

Footnotes

References

Further reading

External links 

 RN Submarines 1936–1958: U Class

 
Submarine classes